Elkhounds are a group of Fennoscandian dog breeds belonging to the Spitz-type dogs and used for hunting elk/moose and other large animals.

Belonging to this group are among others:
 Gray Norwegian Elkhound, also simply known as Norwegian Elkhound,
 Black Norwegian Elkhound
 Hede Elkhound
 Hällefors Elkhound
 Jämthund, also simply known as Swedish Elkhound,
 Swedish White Elkhound.[cf. Swed. WP]

Dog breeds originating in Europe